Paula Słonecka (born 9 April 1992) is a Polish volleyball player, playing in position outside hitter. Since the 2020/2021 season, she has played for Volleyball Wrocław.

References

External links
 TauronLiga profile
 Women.Volleybox profile

1992 births
People from Biała Podlaska
Living people
Polish women's volleyball players